Joseph Scott Sappington (born May 3, 1972) is an American musician, best known as the former lead vocalist of the rock band Saliva. In addition to Saliva, Scott co-wrote and performed "Hero" (which was used as one of the theme songs to the 2002 film Spider-Man) with Chad Kroeger of Nickelback.

Career 
Prior to Saliva, Scott fronted a Memphis-area heavy metal band called BlackBone in the early 1990s. He also plays drums and guitar. He made a cameo appearance on Jay-Z's "Takeover" from his 2001 album The Blueprint. He has also recorded with Lil Wyte ("Homicidal, Suicidal" and "Crazy"), Three 6 Mafia ("Getting Fucked Up" and "Mosh Pit"), and The X-Ecutioners ("(Even) More Human Than Human").

Scott has had minor roles in television and film. He played Rodney Gronbeck, an LAPD computer expert, in the TNT crime drama Wanted. He also has a cameo appearance in the film Hustle & Flow as Elroy, the corner-store employee who sells marijuana to D-Jay, the main character played by Terrance Howard.

Josey Scott sang the song "If You Wanna Get to Heaven" in the straight-to-DVD feature film The Dukes of Hazzard: The Beginning; the song features when the General Lee is pulled from the water.

In 2002, Scott collaborated with Chad Kroeger from the rock band Nickelback on the Spider-Man theme song "Hero". This recording also featured Tyler Connolly, Mike Kroeger, Matt Cameron, and Jeremy Taggart. Winning the Best Video from a Film on the MTV Music Video Awards a year later on 2003.

Scott appeared as a hidden character in the video game Tiger Woods PGA Tour 2003, which features three Saliva songs on the soundtrack: "Raise Up", "Superstar", and "Superstar II (EA Mix)", which is exclusive to the game.

Saliva guitarist Wayne Swinny said in 2013 that Scott had decided to leave the band to pursue a solo Christian career. In October 2019, Scott announced that he would be reuniting with Saliva for a new album and tour.

Personal life 
Scott is married and has three sons and two daughters. His eldest son, Cody, died from complications due to COVID-19 in May 2021 at the age of 29.

Discography

Studio albums

Singles

Collaborations 
 He was featured in the song "Brother" by Hard Rock band Breaking Point
 He also co-wrote and performed the song Hero with Chad Kroeger
 He has also recorded with Lil Wyte in the songs "Homicidal, Suicidal" and "Crazy"
 He also has recorded with Three 6 Mafia in the songs "Getting Fucked Up" and "Mosh Pit"
 He was also featured on the song "(Even) More Human Than Human" by The X-Ecutioners

Awards and nominations 

Grammy Awards

MTV Video Music Awards

References

External links 
Official Saliva website

Josey Scott on TV.com
WMP March Artist of the Month – interview with Josey Scott, lead singer for Saliva, February 8, 2007

Living people
American male singers
American rock guitarists
American male guitarists
American rock singers
Nu metal singers
People from Memphis, Tennessee
Singers from Tennessee
Guitarists from Tennessee
1972 births